Electoral Action of Poles in Lithuania – Christian Families Alliance or EAPL–CFA ( or LLRA–KŠS;  or AWPL–ZCHR) is a political party in Lithuania. It represents the Polish minority and positions itself as Christian-democratic. It has 3 seats in the Seimas, 1 seat in the European Parliament and 57 seats in municipal councils after the 2023 local election.

Formed in 1994 from the political wing of the Association of Poles in Lithuania, LLRA experienced a surge in support in the 2000s, under the leadership of Waldemar Tomaszewski. It increased its representation from under 2% in 2000, leading to the party being invited to join the governing coalition: an invitation they rejected.  They increased their vote again to 3.8% in 2004 and 4.8% in 2008: just short of the 5% election threshold for any of the Seimas's 70 proportional representation seats. In the 2009 European election, they won 8.2% and one seat.  The party's vote is concentrated in the south-east of the country, around the capital, where the Polish minority is located.  At the 2012 election, LLRA broke through 5% in a parliamentary election for the first time: qualifying for proportional representation seats.

In the Seimas, the party sits with fellow right-leaning party Order and Justice. LLRA's MEP (its leader Valdemar Tomaševski) sits in the European Parliament with the European Conservatives and Reformists, which includes the Polish Law and Justice and Poland Comes First, and the party is a member of the ACRE.

History

At the beginning of 1994 the law on social organisations was adopted. According to this law, social organisations had to transform into political parties or simply remain social organizations. Till that time the Association of Poles in Lithuania (LLA) was a public-political organisation. Thus it had the option to act both in social and political spheres. The Polish community which did not have its own party faced the difficult task of keeping the Association and simultaneously enabling its participation in the political life of Lithuania at the same time. The creation of the party required a lot of organizational effort. In this situation the central administration of the LLA convened the 5th Extraordinary Conference of the LLA on 14 August. During the Conference the decision was adopted to transform the APL into a social organisation and support the efforts of the group initiating the establishment of a party set up under the name of the Electoral Action of the LLA. Finally, on 23 October after pressure from the Lithuanian Ministry of Justice to remove the word 'Union' from the name of the party, it was registered as the Electoral Action of Poles in Lithuania (LLRA). During the Founding Conference of 1994 and 1997 Jan Sienkiewicz was elected as LLRA leader. In 1999 during the 3rd LLRA Conference Valdemar Tomaševski became the chairman of the organisation. Moreover, Tomaševski was elected as leader in the 4th and 5th LLRA Conferences.

The LLRA takes part in various elections – starting with municipal through parliamentary and ending with the elections to the European Parliament in 2004. During the whole period of its existence the LLRA took part in defense of the interests of the Polish minority in Lithuania. The Union of the Russians of Lithuania had cooperated with the LLRA in elections, running within a common list in 2004.

In 2016, Electoral Action of Poles in Lithuania changed its name to Electoral Action of Poles in Lithuania – Christian Families Alliance.

Ideology
The party's primary aim is not ideological, but the protection and enhancement of the rights of the Polish minority, who make up 7% of Lithuania's population. Their main policies include the restoration of land seized from Poles by the Soviet government, the improvement of the education system and allowing the use of the Polish language in schools, and giving official recognition to the Polish orthography of names.

It supports a more influential political role for the Roman Catholic Church, mandatory religious education in schools, and a reduction in the number of Lithuanian parliamentarians from 141 to 101 coupled to an increase in the number of local councillors. Since 2005, it unsuccessfully tried to submit bills to penalize abortion.

In the past, LLRA's leader Valdemar Tomaszewski was considered to be a pro-Russian, since he had condemned the Euromaidan protests in Ukraine and had been seen wearing the Ribbon of Saint George, a symbol strongly associated with Russian nationalism and support for Vladimir Putin. However, following the beginning of the 2022 Russian invasion of Ukraine, Tomaszewski condemned Russia's actions and co-authored a motion in the European Parliament in support of Ukraine.

External relations
LLRA is a member of the Europe-wide anti-federalist Alliance of European Conservatives and Reformists (AECR), along with both Law and Justice from Poland. It is also member of the AECR's associated political grouping, the European Conservatives and Reformists, having resisted intensive lobbying from the Polish Civic Platform to join the EPP group, to which Civic Platform belong and to which LLRA had been considered likely to join. Its youth wing belongs to the European Young Conservatives.

The party currently sits with fellow centre-right party Freedom and Justice and the centre-left Lithuanian Regions Party in the "Regions Political Group" in the Seimas. They have agreed an electoral alliance with the Lithuanian Russian Union.

The party has received criticism from some Polish politicians for its support and connections to Russian politicians. This ceased following the beginning of the 2022 Russian invasion of Ukraine, when the party condemned Russia's actions and took a pro-Ukraine stance.

Electoral results

Seimas

European Parliament

Municipal councils

Leaders
 Jan Sienkiewicz (1994–1999)
 Waldemar Tomaszewski (1999–present)

Members of Parliament before 2019 election

See also 
:Category:Electoral Action of Poles in Lithuania – Christian Families Alliance politicians

References

External links
Official website 

Political parties established in 1994
Conservative parties in Lithuania
Political parties of minorities in Lithuania
Lithuania–Poland relations
Alliance of Conservatives and Reformists in Europe member parties
Christian democratic parties in Europe
European Conservatives and Reformists member parties
1994 establishments in Lithuania
Poles in Lithuania